Dorlewadi is a village of Baramati taluka, Pune district, Maharashtra, India. The village is approximately 6.9 km from Baramati, 92.4 km from Pune, and 212 km from Mumbai.

The village is known for famous festivals, such as "Tukaram Biz" and "Mahatma Phule Jayanti".
Every April, after Dehu Gaon, thousands of people gather in Dorlewadi to celebrate Tukaram Biz, the village's largest and most famous festival. Activities at Tukaram Biz include Bhajan and Kirtan.

Schools 
 
 New English School Dorlewadi.
 Sant Tukaram Maharaj Prathamik Vidyalay Dorlewadi.
 Founder Of Sant Tukaram Maharaj Prathamik Vidyalay Dorlewadi Is Mahadeo Kale . Many students of  Sant Tukaram Maharaj Prathamik Vidyalay Dorlewadi ( STMPV ) are selected first , Second & Best performers in country level abacus competitions . School premises is Beautiful & Attractive with lot of Trees.

 Zilha Parishad Prathamic Shala Dorlewadi.
 Sant savatmali English Medium School.

 Colleges

 Vidya Pratishathan College
 T.C College Baramati

References 

Villages in Pune district